SIR REG is a Swedish seven-piece band formed in Köping, Sweden 2009 which plays Celtic punk rock, led by Irish vocalist Brendan Sheehy. They are signed to Despotz Records.

History
Sir Reg was founded in 2009 of members from the band The Barcrawlers and consists of Irish singer Brendan Sheehy and six Swedish musicians, Karin Ullvin, Chris Inoue, Johan Sand, Daniel Petri, Filip Burgman and Olle Karlsson who all come from different musical backgrounds; classical, jazz, rock and punk. They have released five albums, all of which have received positive reviews.

Career
Sir Reg tours constantly and has played in many places throughout Europe. In 2010 they joined Misfits (band) for a three-week tour of Europe.

They've also shared the stage with Danko Jones, Thin Lizzy, Fiddler's Green, The Real McKenzies, Talco, H.E.A.T., The Exploited, The Mahones, KSMB and The Meteors.

Their eponymous début album was voted "Best Celtic rock and punk albums of 2010" by the readers of the Celticfolkpunk and also by listeners on internet radio station Paddy Rock Radio.

Celticfolkpunk has also voted Sir Reg "Best Celtic band of 2010". Their second album "A Sign Of The Times" received great reviews around the world and made it possible for Sir Reg to receive the award for "Best Celtic Rock & Punk Album of 2011" by Paddy Rock Radio, for the second year they have been nominated . Even when the charts from the four main pages of this genre were compared, "A Sign Of The Times" was the most popular album among both fans and critics.

The first two singles from their latest album "21st Century Loser", "'Til The Dead Come Alive" and "Emigrate" are played frequently on radio stations worldwide. On Sweden's biggest rock radio station, Sir Reg - Emigrate ended up on their "Most Wanted" list (five most played songs) many times, including first place twice so far and have now become one of the bands which are played daily.

Paddy Rock Radio and their listeners voted their album "21st Century Loser" into first place out of 25 bands/albums from all over the world, in the category "Best Of Celtic Rock & Punk 2013".

In late 2013, SIR REG got two "Bandit Rock Awards" nominations:
  
 Swedish Breakthrough of the Year
 Best Swedish Album

In late August 2014 SIR REG signed with GAIN Music.

In 2018 they signed with Swedish label Despotz Records.

Musical style
Their music can be described as Celtic punk/rock with strong melodies and meaningful lyrics. Many of the songs are
about Ireland, its politicians and the Irish boom, called The Celtic Tiger.
The band is often compared musically with punk heroes Flogging Molly and Dropkick Murphys.

Members
 Brendan Sheehy - lead vocals, acoustic guitar
 Karin Ullvin – fiddle
 Chris Inoue – electric guitar
 Johan Sand – electric guitar
 Daniel Petri – drums
 Filip Burgman – mandolin
 Olle Karlsson - bass

Discography

Album releases
 2010 - SIR REG
 2011 - A Sign Of The Times
 2013 - 21st Century Loser
 2016 - Modern Day Disgrace
 2018 - The Underdogs
 2022 - Kings Of Sweet Feck All

Single releases
 2011 - Far Away
 2011 - Dublin City
 2011 - A Sign Of The Times
 2012 - How The Hell Can You Sleep?
 2013 - 'Til the Dead Come Alive
 2013 - Emigrate
 2018 - “FOOL (Fight of our Lives)”
 2018 - “Sinner of the Century”
 2018 - “The Underdogs”

References

External links

Review links
Rockingthecraic review of SIR REG - SIR REG (2011)
 Celticfolkpunk blog review of SIR REG - A Sign Of The Times (2011)
 Crows n' Bones review of SIR REG - A Sign Of The Times (2012)
 Rockbladet review on SIR REG - 21st Century Loser (2013)
 Shite'n'Onions review on SIR REG - 21st Century Loser (2013)
 Metal Mouth review SIR REG - 21st Century Loser (2013)
 Rockbladet review SIR REG - Modern Day Disgrace (2016)
 Shite'n'Onions review SIR REG - Modern Day Disgrace (2016)

Interview links
 Skruttmagazine interviews Brendan from SIR REG (2011)
 Celtico Blog interview with SIR REG (2013)
 Paddy Rock Radio interview with SIR REG (2013)
 Kaaoszine.fi interview with SIR REG (2016)

2009 establishments in Sweden
Swedish punk rock groups
Celtic punk groups
Musical groups established in 2009